The 1889 Lafayette football team was an American football team that represented Lafayette College as an independent during the 1889 college football season. Playing without a regular coach, the team compiled a 3–4–2 record and was outscored by a total of 88 to 78. Harry Mackey was the team captain, and E. Snodgrass was the manager. The team played its home games on The Quad in Easton, Pennsylvania.

Schedule

References

Lafayette
Lafayette Leopards football seasons
Lafayette football